The Health Sciences Centre (HSC), located in Winnipeg, is the largest health-care facility in Manitoba and one of the largest hospitals in Canada. It serves the residents of Manitoba, Northwestern Ontario, and Nunavut as both a teaching hospital and as a research centre. HSC is a tertiary care hospital, encompassing many different specialty medical and surgical services. The Health Sciences Centre employs around 8,000 people. A few other health-related institutions are located adjacent to the hospital.

The HSC has a  campus and houses various operations. Adjoined to the west of HSC is the University of Manitoba's Faculty of Health Sciences, a complex of ten buildings. The Cadham Provincial Laboratory is located next door to the hospital and is the main research and investigative arm of the government of Manitoba for infectious disease. The Canadian Blood Services main building is located across the street from the hospital. CancerCare Manitoba is also located adjacent to the hospital.

History
The Health Sciences Centre was established in 1973 by the Government of Manitoba. It combined the Winnipeg General Hospital, Children's Hospital of Winnipeg, Manitoba Rehabilitation Hospital, and the D.A. Stewart Centre (Respiratory Hospital) into a campus with one administration.

On 1 April 2000, The Health Sciences Centre Act amalgamated the HSC with the Winnipeg Regional Health Authority (WRHA); however, the act was subsequently repealed by Manitoba's Legislative Assembly and, a year later, HSC became an operating division of the WRHA, governed by the WRHA Board of Directors.

On 28 November 2016, the new HSC helipad opened up on top of the diagnostic imaging centre. However, the pad was not listed in the Canada Flight Supplement until 1 February 2018.

On 5 April 2019, responsibility over HSC was given to Shared Health.

ER death
In November 2008, the Winnipeg Regional Health Authority cleared  the hospital in the death of Brian Sinclair, a visibly disabled indigenous man. Sinclair died of a bladder infection while waiting 34 hours in the waiting area for the hospital's emergency room. The death has prompted changes in the hospital's triage system.

Facilities 
Found on the Health Sciences Centre campus are various health-care facilities.

 Brodie Centre (University of Manitoba Bannatyne Campus) — adjoined to the west of HSC; houses the University of Manitoba's Faculty of Health Sciences (including the Colleges of Medicine, Pharmacy, Dentistry, and Rehabilitation Sciences), a complex of ten buildings.
 Apotex Centre — houses U of M's Faculty of Pharmacy
 John Buhler Research Centre — upper level of Brodie Centre
 Cadham Provincial Laboratory — located next door to the hospital; the main research and investigative arm of the Government of Manitoba for infectious disease.
 Canadian Blood Services main building — located across the street (north) from the hospital.
 CancerCare Manitoba — located adjacent to the hospital.
 Children's Hospital of Winnipeg — a children's hospital.
 Manitoba Clinic
 Mental Health Crisis Response Centre
 HSC PsycHealth Centre
 Winnipeg Cyclotron Facility (WCF) — opened in 2010 to expand HSC's capacity to provide PET scans.
 HSC Winnipeg Women’s Hospital

Kleysen Institute for Advanced Medicine
The Kleysen Institute for Advanced Medicine (KIAM) is a  medical research facility that focuses on neuroscience, infectious disease, advanced imaging, and medical information. It houses 300 researchers and staff and attracts visiting physicians from across the country.

Named after local businessman and fundraiser Hubert Kleysen, the $25-million project was announced in June 2005 and completed in 2012.

Gallery

References

External links
 Health Sciences Centre

Hospitals in Winnipeg
Research institutes in Manitoba
Hospitals established in 1973
Heliports in Canada
Buildings and structures in downtown Winnipeg